Nu  ( ni ) is the 13th letter of the Greek alphabet (uppercase Ν, lowercase ν), representing the voiced alveolar nasal . In the system of Greek numerals it has a value of 50. It is derived from the ancient Phoenician language nun . Its Latin equivalent is N, though the lowercase resembles the Roman lowercase v.

The name of the letter is written  in Ancient Greek and traditional Modern Greek polytonic orthography, while in Modern Greek it is written  .

Letters that arose from nu include Roman N and Cyrillic Н.

Symbology
Like Mu, the uppercase Nu is normally identical to Latin N and is therefore not used internationally in scientific or mathematical contexts. The lower-case letter  is used as a symbol for:

 Mathematics:
 Degree of freedom in statistics.
 The greatest fixed point of a function, as commonly used in the μ-calculus.
 Free names of a process, as used in the π-calculus.
 One of the Greeks in mathematical finance, known as "vega".
 The reciprocal of 1 plus the interest rate in finance.
 The -adic valuation or -adic order of a number.
Physics:
 Kinematic viscosity in fluid mechanics.
 The frequency of a wave in physics and other fields; sometimes also spatial frequency; wavenumber
 The specific volume in thermodynamics.
 Poisson's ratio, the ratio of strains perpendicular with and parallel with an applied force.
 Any of three kinds of neutrino in particle physics.
 The number of neutrons released per fission of an atom in nuclear physics.
 Molecular vibrational mode,  where x is the number of the vibration (a label).
 The true anomaly, an angular parameter that defines the position of a body moving along an orbit (see orbital elements).
Biology:
 A DNA polymerase found in higher eukaryotes and implicated in translesion synthesis.
Chemistry:
 The stoichiometric coefficient.
Psychology:
 The maximum conditioning possible for an unconditioned stimulus in the Rescorla-Wagner model.

Character encodings

Greek Nu/Coptic Ni

Encodings of Greek Nu and Coptic Ni.

BBX Mathematical Nu

These characters are used only as mathematical symbols. Stylized Greek text should be encoded using the normal Greek letters, with markup and formatting to indicate text style.

See also 

 Movable nu
 N, v

References

Greek letters